The 1986 San Diego Padres season was the 18th season in franchise history.

Offseason
 January 28, 1986: Dane Iorg was signed as a free agent by the Padres.
 March 25, 1986: Mario Ramírez was released by the Padres.

Regular season
 August 17, 1986: Pete Rose played in the last game of his career. It was a game against the San Diego Padres, and Rose was struck out by Goose Gossage.
 September 20, 1986: Tony Gwynn became the 5th player since 1900 to steal 5 bases in one game. He accomplished the feat against the Houston Astros.

Opening Day starters
Tim Flannery
Steve Garvey
Tony Gwynn
Terry Kennedy
Carmelo Martínez
Kevin McReynolds
Graig Nettles
Eric Show
Garry Templeton

Season standings

Record vs. opponents

Roster

Notable transactions
 July 9, 1986: Tim Stoddard was traded by the Padres to the New York Yankees for Ed Whitson.

Player stats

Batting

Starters by position
Note: Pos = Position; G = Games played; AB = At bats; H = Hits; Avg. = Batting average; HR = Home runs; RBI = Runs batted in

Other batters
Note: G = Games played; AB = At bats; H = Hits; Avg. = Batting average; HR = Home runs; RBI = Runs batted in

Pitching

Starting pitchers
Note: G = Games pitched; IP = Innings pitched; W = Wins; L = Losses; ERA = Earned run average; SO = Strikeouts

Other pitchers
Note: G = Games pitched; IP = Innings pitched; W = Wins; L = Losses; ERA = Earned run average; SO = Strikeouts

Relief pitchers
Note: G = Games pitched; IP = Innings pitched; W = Wins; L = Losses; SV = Saves; ERA = Earned run average; SO = Strikeouts

Award winners
 Tony Gwynn, National League Leader At-Bats (642)
 Tony Gwynn, National League Leader Hits (211)
 Tony Gwynn, National League Leader Runs (107)
 Craig Lefferts, National League Leader for Appearances by a Pitcher (83)
1986 Major League Baseball All-Star Game
Tony Gwynn, outfield, starter

Farm system

LEAGUE CHAMPIONS: Las Vegas

References

External links
 1986 San Diego Padres at Baseball Reference
 1986 San Diego Padres at Baseball Almanac

San Diego Padres seasons
San Diego Padres season
San Diego Padres